Saint Paul's Outreach (SPO) is a Catholic missionary organization in the United States which serves college students and young adults. It is a private association of the faithful established in the Archdiocese of Saint Paul and Minneapolis. SPO describes its mission as follows: "to build transformational communities that form missionary disciples for life."

SPO sees itself as a movement of the "new evangelization" popularized by Pope John Paul II. Its ministry model is "reach, call, form, send."

History

SPO was founded in Saint Paul, Minnesota, where it reached students at the University of St. Thomas. By 2016 it had mission centers in seven different parts of the country.

The Kansas City mission center expanded to include the University of Missouri–Kansas City in 2016. SPO's Florida region expanded to the University of South Florida in 2021.

Current chapter locations

 Arizona
 Arizona State University
 Florida
 Florida State University
 University of Central Florida
 University of South Florida
 Kansas City
 Benedictine College
 Johnson County Community College
 University of Missouri–Kansas City
 Minnesota
 University of Minnesota, Twin Cities
 University of St. Thomas
 Ohio
 The Ohio State University
 University of Cincinnati 
 Northeastern United States
 Northeastern University
 Rutgers University
 Seton Hall University
 Texas
 Texas State University

Notable former members
 Andrew H. Cozzens, bishop of the Diocese of Crookston

See also 
 Catholic Christian Outreach
 Fellowship of Catholic University Students
 NET Ministries

References

External links
 Official website

Christian organizations established in 1980
Catholic organizations established in the 20th century
Christian organizations established in the 20th century
Student religious organizations in Canada
Catholic youth organizations
Catholic missions
Catholic student organizations